A by-election was held for the New South Wales Legislative Assembly electorate of Cumberland North Riding on 11 December 1857 because of the resignation of John Darvall.

Dates

Result

The by-election was caused by the resignation of John Darvall in November 1857.

See also
Electoral results for the district of Cumberland (North Riding)
List of New South Wales state by-elections

References

1857 elections in Australia
New South Wales state by-elections
1850s in New South Wales